Ctenolucius is a genus of pike-characins found in southern Central America (Panama) and northwestern South America (Colombia and Venezuela).  The currently described species in this genus are:
 Ctenolucius beani (Fowler, 1907)
 Ctenolucius hujeta (Valenciennes, 1850) (gar characin)

References
 

Ctenoluciidae
Taxa named by Theodore Gill